Neal of the Navy is a 1915 American adventure film serial directed by William Bertram and W. M. Harvey. The film is considered to be lost. Neal of the Navy was the first use of a man's name in the title of a serial.

Plot
An Annapolis cadet is thrown out of the Naval Academy for cheating on an exam. He was framed, but he must enlist in the Navy to clear himself. Meanwhile, he and his sweetheart search for a buried treasure on Lost Island, which everyone is after.

A map is torn.

Cast
 William Courtleigh, Jr. as Neal Hardin
 Lillian Lorraine as Annette Illington
 William Conklin as Thomas Illington
 Ed Brady as Hernandez
 Henry Stanley as Ponto
 Richard Johnson as Joe Welcher
 Charles Dudley
 Helen Lackaye as Mrs. Hardin
 Bruce Smith as Captain John Hardin
 Lucy Blake
 Philo McCullough (unconfirmed)

See also
 List of film serials
 List of film serials by studio
 List of lost films

References

External links

1915 films
1915 adventure films
1915 lost films
American silent serial films
American black-and-white films
American adventure films
Films directed by William Bertram
Lost American films
Lost adventure films
1910s American films
Silent adventure films